Michael Armitage (born 1984) is a British artist who was born in Kenya. In May 2022 the Royal Mint announced that he is designing a new £1 coin for the United Kingdom which will be issued in 2023.

Early life and education
Armitage is the son of a English father from Yorkshire and a Kenyan mother of Kikuyu ancestry.

In 2007, he received a BA degree from the Slade School of Fine Art, London.  He earned a Postgraduate Diploma from the Royal Academy Schools, London in 2010.

Exhibitions
In 2019 he had a solo show of his work at the Museum of Contemporary Art in Sydney, Australia. In 2019 his work was included in the 58th Venice Biennale.

Armitage has a solo show of his work in 2020 at the Museum of Modern Art, New York. The same year, he exhibited 70 of his paintings in a solo show at Munich's Haus der Kunst.

Honours and awards
In January 2022, he was elected a Royal Academician by the Royal Academy of Arts.

Collections
Art Gallery of New South Wales, Sydney, Australia
Arts Council Collection, London
Metropolitan Museum of Art, New York 
Museum of Contemporary Art, Chicago 
National Galleries Scotland
San Francisco Museum of Modern Art 
Zabludowicz Collection

References

1984 births
Living people
Artists from Nairobi
Kenyan artists
Coin designers